Dutt is a family name of varied origins. The English family name "Dutt" is derived from Middle English language word dut, meaning delight. The Indian family name Dutt is a variation of the surname Datta. People with the name include:

Surname 
 Amit Dutt, Indian scientist
 Anil Dutt, Indian cricketer
 Anjan Dutt, Indian film personality
 Aroti Dutt, Indian social worker
 Ashok Krishna Dutt, Indian politician
 Ashwini Dutt, Indian film producer
 Avijit Dutt, is an Indian film and theatre personality
 Ayesha Dutt, Indian film producer, model and actress
 Bahar Dutt, Indian television journalist
 Barkha Dutt, Indian television journalist
 Batukeshwar Dutt, Indian independence activist and revolutionary
 Brahm Dutt, Indian politician
 Chi. Guru Dutt, Indian actor
 Ganesh Dutt, Indian lawyer and administrator
 Geeta Dutt, Indian singer
 Gopal Datt, Indian actor and writer
 Guru Dutt Sondhi, Indian sports administrator
 Guru Dutt, Indian film director, producer and actor
 Gurusaday Dutt, Indian civil servant folklorist, and writer
 Gurusai Dutt, Indian badminton player
 Gyan Dutt, Indian music director
 Keshav Dutt, Indian field hockey player
 Krishan Dutt Sultanpuri, Indian politician
 Kyra Dutt, Indian actress
 Maanayata Dutt, Indian entrepreneur
 Mallika Dutt, Indian-American human rights activist
 Michael Madhusudan Dutt, Indian Bengali-language dramatist and poet
 Nalinaksha Dutt, Indian politician
 Narayan Dutt Sharma, Indian politician
 Nargis Dutt, Indian film actress
 Neel Dutt, Indian music composer and singer
 Nikil Dutt, American professor of computer science
 Nirupama Dutt, Indian poet, journalist and translator
 Parvez Dewan, (Dewan Parvez Dutt), Indian author and administrator 
 Prabhabati Bose (Dutt), mother of Indian leader Subhas Chandra Bose
 Priya Dutt, Indian politician
 Priyanka Dutt, Indian film producer
 Probodh Dutt, Indian cricketer
 Rajani Palme Dutt, British politician
 Ritika Dutt, Canadian entrepreneur
 Robin Dutt, German football player
 Romesh Chunder Dutt, Indian civil servant and writer
 Sadhan Dutt, Indian scientist and entrepreneur
 Salme Pekkala-Dutt, Estonian-British communist politician, wife of Rajani Palme Dutt
 Sanjay Balraj Dutt, Indian actor and film producer
 Sanjay Dutt, Indian actor
 Saroj Nalini Dutt, Indian feminist and social reformer
 Shekhar Dutt, Indian bureaucrat
 Subimal Dutt, Indian diplomat3
 Sunil Dutt, Indian wrestler
 Sunil Dutt, Indian movie actor and politician
 Sunil K. Dutt, Indian photographer
 Swapna Dutt, Indian film producer
 Toru Dutt, Indian Bengali-language poet
 Tribhuvan Dutt, Indian politician
 Uday Chand Dutt, Indian physician
 Utpal Dutt, Indian actor, director, and writer-playwright
 Vidya Prakash Dutt, Indian educationist and parliamentarian
 Yashica Dutt, Indian writer and journalist
 Yogendra Dutt, Fijian professional football manager
 Yogeshwar Dutt, Indian wrestler

Middle name 
 Anvita Dutt Guptan, Indian film writer
 Brahm Dutt Dwivedi, Indian cabinet minister
 Chandra Dutt Pande, Indian politician
 Kamlesh Dutt Tripathi, Indian theatre personality and professor
 Munishwar Dutt Upadhyay, Indian politician
 Shambhu Dutt Sharma, Indian independence and anti-corruption activist
 Shri Dutt Sharma, Indian politician
 Som Dutt Battu, Indian vocalist
 Sunil Dutt Dwivedi, Indian politician
 Vijay Dutt Shridhar, Indian journalist and writer

See also
 B.C. Dutt-class tugboat, a series of service watercraft

References 

Indian surnames